is a Japanese anime storyboard artist, sound director and director best known for working with Studio Pierrot on series such as Yu Yu Hakusho, Ninku, Flame of Recca and Bleach. The former won the Animage Anime Grand Prix award in 1993 and 1994.

Works
 Norakuro-kun (1987 TV series) – Episode director
 Musashi, the Samurai Lord (1990 TV series) – Storyboard, episode director
 Ore wa Chokkaku (1991 TV series) – Episode director
 Yu Yu Hakusho: Ghost Files (1992 TV series) – Director, storyboard, episode director, animation director
 Yu Yu Hakusho: The Movie (1993 film) – Director
 Yu Yu Hakusho the Movie: Poltergeist Report (1994 film) – Supervision
 Ninku (1995 TV series) – Director, storyboard
 Ninku: The Movie (1995 film) – Director, storyboard
 Midori no Makibaō (1996 TV series) – Director, episode director
 Flame of Recca (1997 TV series) – Director, Storyboard, episode director
 Saber Marionette J to X (1998 TV series) – Storyboard (ep 16)
 Chiisana Kyojin Microman (1999 TV series) – Series director
 Great Teacher Onizuka (1999 TV series) – Director, storyboard, recording Director
 Banner of the Stars (2000 TV series) – Storyboard
 Ghost Stories (2000 TV series) – Director, sound director
 Super Gals! Kotobuki Ran (2001 TV series) – Storyboard (eps #5, #8)
 Banner of the Stars II (2001 TV series) – Storyboard
 Tokyo Mew Mew (2002 TV series) – Director, recording Director
 Detective School Q (2003 TV series) – Director, storyboard, episode director
 Bleach (2004 TV series) – Director, storyboard, episode director, technical director
 Bleach: Memories in the Rain (2004 OVA) – Director
 Bleach: The Sealed Sword Frenzy (2005 OVA) – Director
 Bleach: Memories of Nobody (2006 film) – Director, storyboard
 Bleach: The DiamondDust Rebellion (2007 film) – Director, storyboard, unit director
 Bleach: Fade to Black (2008 film) – Director
 Bleach: Hell Verse (2010 film) – Director
 Black Butler: Book of Circus (2014 TV series) – Director
 Black Butler: Book of Murder (2014 OVA) – Director
 Black Butler: Book of the Atlantic (2017 film) – Director
 The Heroic Legend of Arslan (2015 TV series) – Director
 The Heroic Legend of Arslan: Dust Storm Dance (2016 TV series) – Director
 Divine Gate (2016 TV series) – Director
 Boruto: Naruto Next Generations (2017 TV series) – Chief director (eps #1–#104)
 The Seven Deadly Sins the Movie: Prisoners of the Sky (2018 film) – Chief director
 Kochoki: Wakaki Nobunaga (2019 TV series) – Director
 Arad Senki: The Wheel of Reversal (2020) – Director
 The Seven Deadly Sins: Grudge of Edinburgh (2022–2023) – Chief director

References

External links 
 

1961 births
Living people
Anime directors
Japanese television directors
Japanese film directors
Japanese storyboard artists
People from Kyoto
Japanese voice directors
Japanese people of Filipino descent